John Piscopo is a Republican member of the Connecticut House of Representatives and is the Senior Republican Whip, the third-highest ranking leadership position within the House Republican caucus.  He represents Burlington, Harwinton, Litchfield, and Thomaston. He was first elected in 1988.  Piscopo is a board member of the American Legislative Exchange Council (ALEC). In October 2012, he was one of nine U.S. state legislators who went on an "ALEC Academy" trip to explore the Alberta tar sands.

References

External links
John Piscopo at the Connecticut House of Representatives
John Piscopo on Balloptedia
Project Vote Smart – Representative John Piscopo (CT) profile
Our Campaigns – Representative John Piscopo (CT) profile

 

Republican Party members of the Connecticut House of Representatives
Living people
21st-century American politicians
Year of birth missing (living people)